Walter of Saint-Valéry (d. after 1098), son of Bernard I of Saint-Valéry.  Lord of Isleworth and Hampton in Middlesex, Creeting in Suffolk.  Walter was a participant in the First Crusade, accompanying Robert of Normandy as a member of Robert's army.  He was present at the siege of Nicaea in 1097 and scouted with the Turkish Christian convert Bohemond the army of Ridwan before the Battle of the Lake of Antioch.  He guarded Adhemar of Le Puy in the mountains near the port of Simeon after finding what was thought to be the Holy Lance.

Walter married Hodierna of Montlhéry, daughter of Guy I of Montlhéry and Hodierna of Gometz.  Walter and Hodierna had two sons:
 Bernard II of Saint-Valéry
 Eudon of Saint-Valéry.

 took the cross and participated in the First Crusade.  Bernard II was present with his father at the siege of Nicaea.

References

Sources 
 Runciman, Steven, A History of the Crusades, Volume I: The First Crusade and the Foundation of the Kingdom of Jerusalem, Cambridge University Press, London, 1951
 
 Riley-Smith, Jonathan, The First Crusaders, 1095-1131, Cambridge University Press, 1997
 La Monte, John L., The Lords of Le Puiset on the Crusades, Speculum, 1942
 Chibnall, Marjorie (translator), The Ecclesiastical History of Orderic Vitalis, Oxford Medieval Texts, Oxford, 1968–1980
 

Christians of the First Crusade
11th-century French people